Chrysophyllum mexicanum is a plant in the family Sapotaceae, native to Mexico and Central America.

Description

Distribution and habitat
Chrysophyllum mexicanum is native to an area from northern Mexico to Nicaragua.

References

mexicanum
Flora of Mexico
Flora of Central America
Plants described in 1924
Taxa named by Townshend Stith Brandegee